Bulat Hockey Club, commonly referred as Bulat Temirtau, was a Soviet and Kazakh ice hockey team based in Temirtau, Kazakhstan. They were active from 1960 to 2005.

Achievements
Kazakhstan Hockey Championship:
Winners (1): 1998–99
Runners-up (2): 1994–95, 1997–98
3rd place (3): 1992–93, 1999–2000, 2000–01

See also
Arystan Temirtau

References

Defunct ice hockey teams in Kazakhstan
Temirtau